Walking with Dinosaurs (or Wonderbook: Walking with Dinosaurs) is an augmented reality video game developed by Supermassive Games in collaboration with the BBC, as part of the resurgence of the "Walking with Dinosaurs", "Planet Dinosaur", "March of the Dinosaurs" and "Chased by Dinosaurs". It was released in Europe on 13 November 2013, and in North America on 12 November 2013, alongside Diggs Nightcrawler and Book of Potions.

Gameplay
Wonderbook: Walking with Dinosaurs features multiple activities across five chapters, each of which is split into two sections, with each section involving a full "read" of the Wonderbook. Each chapter takes place at a different dig site, and begins with the player using the PlayStation Move controller to simulate different tools, with the goal of excavating the skeletal remains of a dinosaur, then using them to reconstruct the beast. From there, activities include battles between dinosaurs and mating rituals, where the Move controller is used to simulate movement and actions; using the Move controller as an X-ray torch to scan dinosaurs and explore their skeletons and organs, and balancing the weight of dinosaurs using different vehicles, among other activities.

The game also features questions to test the player's knowledge, with each section culminating in a five-question quiz. Each chapter also tells a different story, introducing different characters and dinosaur species. The first chapter features characters from the Walking with Dinosaurs feature film. Depending on their performance in the activities, the player will receive gold, silver, or bronze medals. Each activity also features a number of fact cards to find and collect. Players can then view their collection from a separate section of the game.

Chapters

Reception
In a joint review with Book of Potions, Telegraph writer Andy Robertson (who also reviewed Diggs Nightcrawler) gave the game a positive review, noting the multiple uses of the Move controller and the quality of the storylines detailing the lives and interactions of different dinosaur species.

References

External links
 PlayStation UK page
 Supermassive Games page
 Walking with Dinosaurs page

2013 video games
Wonderbook games
PlayStation Move-compatible games
Video games developed in the United Kingdom
PlayStation 3 games
PlayStation 3-only games
Supermassive Games
Walking with...
Dinosaurs in video games
Video games based on television series